Jos De Cock (15 January 1934 – 10 October 2010), was a Belgian-French painter, watercolorist, etcher and sculptor.

She is also known as Jojo Restany, Josiane De Cock, José-Anne Decock Restany, Josianne de Koch, Jose-Anne Martine Paulette Decock, Josyane, or Josée-Anne.

Education
Jos De Cock received her training at the academy of Etterbeek (Belgium) and at the Académie de la Grande Chaumière in Paris.
In Belgium, she also took courses with Edgard Tytgat and in France with André Lhote.

Work
De Cock was active from 1956 until later in her life. Her work has been described as symbolism. De Cock received the Prix de la Jeune Penture Belge in 1958, as well as an award from the Musée d'Art Moderne the same year. She received a medal from the City of Paris in 1960.

Collections
De Cock's work is held in the permanent collections of the Museo De La Solidaridad Salvador Allende, the Musée d'Art Moderne de Paris and the Bibliothèque nationale de France, among others.

Personal life
Later in life, De Cock married art critic Pierre Restany.

She is buried together with Pierre Restany at the Montparnasse cemetery in Paris.

Select solo exhibitions

 1956  Brussels, Belgium, Galerie Renoir
 1956  Paris, France, Galerie Apollo
 1956  Paris, France, Galerie Voyelles
 1958  Paris, France, Galerie Colette Allendy
 1958  Paris, France, Club des Quatre-Vents
 1962  Knokke-le-Zoute, Belgium, Galerie du Casino
 1963  Brussels, Belgium, Galerie Ravenstein
 1963  Genève, Switzerland, Galerie Saint-Germain
 1963  Liège, Belgique, A.P.I.A.W
 1965  Paris, France, Galerie Saint-Luc
 1967  Antwerp, Belgium, Galerie Campo
 1970  London, United Kingdom, Roland, Browse et Delblanco
 1977  Saint-Paul-de-Vence, France, Musée Municipal
 1979  Paris, France, Galerie Jean-Pierre Lavignes
 1980  Rio de Janeiro, Brasil, Galerie "Café des Arts"
 1984  Montpellier, France, Musée Olivier Brice, Château de Cambous - Vios en Laval
 1985  Nancy, France, Galerie Municipale, Hôtel de Ville
 1986  Paris, France, Paris Art Center
 1987  Paris, France, Galerie Eolia

Bibliography
 José Pierre, Jos de Cock: And the secret unity of the world, 1987
 Paul Piron, De belgische beeldende kunstenaars uit de 19de en 20ste eeuw, Ohain : Éditions Art in Belgium, 1999 
 Auction catalogue: Collection Pierre et Jojo Restany, Digard Auction, Paris, les 24 et 25 octobre 2015. https://docplayer.fr/78218411-Collection-pierre-et-jojo-restany-24-et-25-octobre-2015-digard-auction.html
 Patrick-Gilles Persin (préface), Jos Decock ou les Tentations fantasmagoriques, catalogue d'exposition, Paris Art Center, Paris, 1986
 Nam June Paik, Jos De Cock: Dessins et aquarelles, exhibition catalogue, 23 April - 15 June 1988 at the Château de Nemours, preface by Pierre Restany, 1988.
 Auction catalogue: Les Années magiques 1954-1978 - Autour d'Iris Clert et Pierre Restany, Pierre Bergé & Associés, Paris, 29 mars 2009. https://cdn.drouot.com/d/catalogue?path=berge/design/29032009/290309_magique.pdf
 Pierre Cabanne (préface), JOS DECOCK, Les Cahiers Eolia Paris, 1987

References

External links
 Jos de Cock (1991) by Gérard Courant - Cinématon #1484
 Jos de Cock and Pierre Restany (1991) by Gérard Courant - Couple #82
 Le chat Pupu avec Jos de Cock (1991) by Gérard Courant - Cinématou #4
 Jos De Cock's biography on ArtLand
 Artist profile on invaluable.com
 Artist's profile askart.com

1934 births
2010 deaths
Belgian painters
Belgian contemporary artists
20th-century women artists
French women artists
Belgian women artists
Artists from Paris